Marsyangdi Hydropower Station (मर्स्याङ्दी जलविद्युत आयोजना)is a run-of-river hydro-electric plant located in Aanbukhaireni, Tanahu District of Nepal. The flow from the Marshyangdi River is used to generate 69 MW electricity and 462.5 GWh of annual energy. The rated net head is 90.5 m and rated flow is 30.5 m3/s.  The plant is owned and operated by Nepal Electricity Authority. The plant started generating electricity since 1989AD. The power station is connected to the national grid.

Finance
The project was financed by a Nepal government in assistance from IDA, KFW, KFED, SFD, ADB and GON at a cost of US$22 million.

See also

Upper Marsyandgi A Hydroelectric Station 
List of power stations in Nepal

References

External links
Nepal Electricity Authority

Hydroelectric power stations in Nepal
Gravity dams
Run-of-the-river power stations
Dams in Nepal
1989 establishments in Nepal
Buildings and structures in Tanahun District